Chanchalguda is a locality in Old City, Hyderabad. It is located near Saidabad and Dabirpura. The Chanchalguda Central Jail is located here.

Transport
Chanchalguda is connected by buses run by TSRTC. Buses that run are 98 connecting to Nampally and 78 connecting to Charminar But 78 number service is discontinued.

The closest MMTS train stations are at Dabirpura and Malakpet.

Culture 
Chanchalguda people are known to be migrated afghans. Chanchalguda has a historic temple of Lord Vishnu, it is popular here as Lord Chenna Keshava Swamy Temple. It is 106 years old and is located in the central street opposite to City Function Hall. 

Shri Krishna Janmashtami is the prominent festival here which is celebrated with the citing of Kannan Thiru Nakshatram as Thiti for the occasion and the festival is celebrated for 9 days including various Annual Ceremonies, Pujas and Homams, out of which 6th day is celebrated for Lord Krishna's  birthday with the special puja called "Dolarohanam" which means Unjal Seva and on 8th day there will be "Garuda Seva" which is procession of Lord Vishnu on Rath through the streets of Chanchanguda.

Schools 
Schools in the area include the popular Chanchalguda Government Junior College, Modern High School, Farah High School, Rehmatia High School, St. Lawrence High School, Caramel High School and Neo School Aizza.

References

Neighbourhoods in Hyderabad, India